Greg "Craola" Simkins (born February 28, 1975) is an American artist.

Education and early life
Greg Simkins was born in Torrance, California, slightly south of Los Angeles. His artistic ambitions bloomed at age three with drawings inspired by cartoons and books. Some of these works, such as The Chronicles of Narnia by C.S. Lewis, The Phantom Tollbooth by Norton Juster, and Watership Down by Richard Adams, still find reference in his art. He grew up with a variety of animals, including a number of rabbits, which often appear in his paintings.

Simkins earned his B.A. in Studio Art from California State University, Long Beach in 1999.

Professional career
After graduating, Simkins went to work as an illustrator for several clothing firms before moving on to the video game industry, where he worked on games for Treyarch/Activision such as Tony Hawk's Pro Skater 2, Spider-Man 2, and Ultimate Spider-Man. He made the leap to full-time artist in 2005.

Style
At the age of 18, Simkins began doing graffiti under the name "Craola". Graffiti drove his inspiration to create and gave him the confidence and experience to paint large scale works. It also taught him color theory and perspective while further developing his artistic skills, as later demonstrated in his masterful work with acrylics.

Out of his love for the animal world he seeks to bring together unlikely camaraderies and conflicts from the landscape of his mind to the confines of canvas, paper, and walls. It is common to see deer with killer whales, puppies with crustacean pals, and birds sharing the air with rodents in his playfully ominous to ominously playful acrylic compositions informed by smooth, graffiti gradients and balanced layouts that draw the eye through story lines and little vignettes.

Exhibitions
Simkins' paintings have been included in various narrative art exhibitions including the group shows Suggestivism at Grand Central Art Center in Santa Ana, Family Guy! at the Los Angeles Museum of TV & Radio, Street Cred at the Pasadena Museum of California Art, Visionary Art at Mondo Bizarro Gallery in Rome, Art from the New World at the Bristol City Museum and Art Gallery in Bristol, England, Sons of Baby Tattooville at the Riverside Art Museum, and MasterWorks: Defining A New Narrative at the Long Beach Museum of Art.

Simkins' solo shows include: Good Knight, Stop Haunting Me, and Cloud Theory at Merry Karnowsky Gallery in Los Angeles; Inside the Outside at Joshua Liner Gallery in New York; a two-person exhibit with Lola at Galerie d'Art Yves Laroche in Montreal; The Pearl Thief at Gallery Nineteen Eighty Eight in Los Angeles; Seeing Things at FIFTY24/SF Gallery in San Francisco; It Wanders West at Gallery Nineteen Eighty Eight; It Wanders East at Joshua Liner Gallery; The Well at m modern Gallery in Palm Springs, CA; I’m Scared at Gallery Nineteen Eighty Eight; Don’t Sleep at FIFTY24/SF Gallery; and Ima Monsta at Gallery Nineteen Eighty Eight.

Simkins had his curatorial debut with INLE at Gallery Nineteen Eighty Eight in 2011, a show in which he also participated. The exhibit included art inspired by the book Watership Down by over 100 artists.

Publications

Publications by Simkins
 Simkins, Greg. (2011) Drawn From the Well. Presto Art. .
 Simkins, Greg. (2013) The Outside. Presto Art. .

Publications with contributions by Simkins
 Ganz, Nicholas & Manco, Tristan. (2004) Graffiti World: Street Art from Five Continents. Harry N. Abrams, Inc. .
 Gibson, Jon M. and Klosterman, Chuck (2006) i am 8-bit: Art Inspired by Classic Videogames of the '80s. Chronicle. .
 Beinart, Jon. (2007) Metamorphosis 2: 50 Contemporary Surreal, Fantastic, and Visionary Artists. BeinART. .
 Weber, Diana. (2009) Juxtapoz Dark Arts. Gingko. .
 Owens, Annie. (2009) Hi-fructose Collected Edition. Last Gasp of San Francisco. .
 Spoor, Nathan. (2011) Suggestivism: A Comprehensive Survey of Contemporary Artists. Gingko. .
 Ziegler, Tina. (2010) Hunt & Gather. Mark Batty. .
 Smith, Kevin & Gallery 1988. (2011) Crazy 4 Cult: Cult Movie Art. Titan. .
 Eaton, Tristan, and McCormick, Carlo. (2011) The 3D Art Book. Prestel. .

References

External links 

Greg "Craola" Simkins at Beinart Gallery Available art & bio

1975 births
Living people
20th-century American painters
American male painters
21st-century American painters
21st-century American male artists
Painters from California
People from Torrance, California
American graffiti artists
20th-century American male artists